Crystal Lake is near the village of Barton in Orleans County, Vermont. Route 5 runs along the lake's western shore. Crystal Lake is in the northeast section of the state of Vermont. The lake is owned by the state and managed by the Department of Environmental Conservation.

Exotic species infestations are a concern, with an existing Eurasian water milfoil population, which is being addressed.

The lake is a coldwater fishery. Lake trout are native and the current population is wild. There are rainbow trout (wild and stocked), yellow perch, smallmouth bass, rockbass, pumpkinseed, chain pickerel, longnose suckers, white suckers, and various minnow species.

History
Rogers' Rangers were forced to retreat through the area following their attack on Saint-Francis, Quebec in 1759.  The fleeing rangers split up before getting to Barton. One group followed the Barton River south to the falls at the outlet of Crystal Lake where they were able to catch fish. From there, they continued south over the summit into the Passumpsic River Valley.

In the 19th century, the lake was sometimes called "Belle Pond."

Construction on a dam to enhance and control the lake was completed in 1860. It consists of concrete, stone, and masonry. The core is concrete. The foundation is rock, and soil.

Around 1900, a granite quarry was located on the east side of the lake. Steamboats barged stone across to the west side.

The lake has two parks at the north end. The State Park started by the CCC during the depression but not completed until the 1940s. It is at the northwestern edge. It was added to the National Register of Historic Places August 30, 2005.

Adjacent to the state park, at the northeastern end, is Pageant Park, the Barton, Vermont town park.

Footnotes

External links

See also
 Barton, Vermont
 Lake Willoughby
 Glacial Lake

Crystal
Barton, Vermont
Glacial lakes of the United States
Lakes of Orleans County, Vermont